Félix Luciano Leguizamón (born 1 July 1982) is an Argentine footballer and his current team is the Guaraní Antonio Franco of the Primera B Nacional.

Career

Leguizamón started his career in Gimnasia y Esgrima de Concepción del Uruguay. He then moved on to River Plate. Not having played much at River, he was loaned to Unión de Santa Fe and Polideportivo Ejido (Spain). Subsequently, he joined Talleres de Córdoba where he fought unsuccessfully to get the team's promotion to Argentine Primera División. He then played for Gimnasia y Esgrima de La Plata between 2006 and 2007.

His exit from Gimnasia was not amicable. The fans turned against him after he traded shirts with Juan Sebastian Verón at halftime of the derby with Estudiantes de la Plata in 2007.

He subsequently moved to Arsenal de Sarandí. In August 2009, he was loaned to Al-Ittihad in Saudi Arabia and, returned to Arsenal in January 2010.

Honours
Arsenal
Argentine Primera División (1): 2012 Clausura

References

External links
 Luciano Leguizamon's goals in Arsenal Futbol Club Of Sarandí (Argentina) (Part 1)
 Luciano Leguizamon's goals in Arsenal Futbol Club Of Sarandí (Argentina) (Part 2)
 
 

1982 births
Living people
Sportspeople from Entre Ríos Province
Argentine people of Basque descent
Argentine footballers
Argentine expatriate footballers
Association football forwards
Club Atlético River Plate footballers
Unión de Santa Fe footballers
Polideportivo Ejido footballers
Talleres de Córdoba footballers
Club Atlético Colón footballers
Ittihad FC players
Saudi Professional League players
Club de Gimnasia y Esgrima La Plata footballers
Arsenal de Sarandí footballers
Club Atlético Independiente footballers
Everton de Viña del Mar footballers
Chilean Primera División players
Argentine Primera División players
Expatriate footballers in Chile
Expatriate footballers in Saudi Arabia
Expatriate footballers in Spain
Argentine expatriate sportspeople in Saudi Arabia